Mohamed Youssef  (born 9 October 1970) is an Egyptian professional footballer who played as a defender for several clubs in Egypt, Turkey and Egypt national team.

Club career
Youssef began his professional career in the Egyptian Premier League with Al Ahly, winning six league titles over an eight-year period. In 1999, he moved to Turkey where he played in the Super Lig for Denizlispor and Diyarbakirspor. He returned to Egypt to play with Egyptian Premier League side ENPPI.

International career
Youssef has started his career with the U-17 national team and played with them at the 1987 U-17 world Cup in Canada and also played with the U-19 national team.

Youssef was the captain of the Egyptian team in the Barcelona 1992 Summer Olympics and scored a goal against Colombia. He made his debut with the first Egyptian national team in a 1994 African Nations Cup qualifier against Morocco on 11 July 1993. Youssef made 95 appearances for Egypt national football team, including three matches at the 1999 FIFA Confederations Cup, three qualifying matches for the 1998 FIFA World Cup and two qualifying matches for the 2002 FIFA World Cup. He won with Egypt the 1998 African Nations Cup, and also played in the 1994 African Nations Cup and 2000 African Nations Cup.

Coaching career
Youssef began his coaching career as an assistant coach at Al–Ahly's first team in June 2009 until April 2013.

On May 7, 2013, Youssef was promoted as head coach. He led Al-Ahly to win the 2013 CAF Champions League, and reached the 2013 FIFA Club World Cup. in Morocco. On May 1, 2014, he resigned from Al-Ahly. On July 23, 2014, he was appointed as manager of Iraqi Premier League champions Al Shorta SC. Despite winning 11 and drawing 4 of the 15 league games he took charge of and was leading their group in the AFC Cup, he was sacked in May 2015. In July 2015, he became head coach of Smouha in the Egyptian premier league, playing also with the Alexandrian club in the CAF champions league. In July 2016, he returned to Iraqi Premier League Al Shorta SC as head coach.

In July 2017, he became head coach of Petrojet in the Egyptian premier league. In June 2018, Youssef returned to Al-Ahly as an assistant coach and sports director till the end of his contract on 31 August 2019.

On October 19, 2020, he was appointed as the head coach of the newly-promoted National Bank of Egypt.

Managerial statistics

Honors

Player
Al Ahly
Egyptian Premier League: 1993–94, 1994–95, 1995–96, 1996–97, 1997–98, 1998–99
Egypt Cup: 1990–91, 1991–92, 1992–93, 1995–96
Egyptian Confederation Cup: 1989
African Cup Winners' Cup: 1993
Arab Champions Cup: 1996
Arab Super Cup: 1997, 1998
Arab Cup Winners' Cup: 1994

International
African Cup of Nations: 1998

Manager
Al-Ahly
CAF Champions League: 2013
CAF Super Cup: 2014

References

External links
 
 
 Profile at Dr. Tarek Said's Homepage
 Mohamed Youssef at Footballdatabase

1970 births
Living people
Egyptian footballers
Egyptian expatriate footballers
Egypt international footballers
1994 African Cup of Nations players
1998 African Cup of Nations players
1999 FIFA Confederations Cup players
2000 African Cup of Nations players
Al Mokawloon Al Arab SC players
Al Ahly SC players
Denizlispor footballers
Diyarbakırspor footballers
ENPPI SC players
Süper Lig players
Expatriate footballers in Turkey
Egyptian expatriate sportspeople in Turkey
Al Ahly SC managers
Al-Shorta SC managers
Smouha SC managers
Petrojet SC managers
Egyptian football managers
Olympic footballers of Egypt
Footballers at the 1992 Summer Olympics
Egyptian Premier League players
Association football defenders
Expatriate football managers in Iraq
Egyptian expatriate sportspeople in Iraq